Mystery in Shanghai (French: Mystère à Shanghai) is a 1950 French crime film directed by Roger Blanc and starring Paul Bernard, Hélène Perdrière and Maurice Teynac. It is based on the novel La Nuit du 12 au 13 by Stanislas-André Steeman.

The film's sets were designed by the art director Aimé Bazin.

Synopsis
In Shanghai, a Chinese criminal organisation plans to kill Herbert Aboody if he doesn't pay them $50,000.

Cast
 Paul Bernard as Herbert Aboody
 Maurice Teynac as Inspecteur Wens
 Hélène Perdrière as Floriane Aboody
 Pierre Jourdan as Steve
 Andrews Engelmann as Zetskaïa
 Robert Lussac as Maloise
 Ky Duyen as Commissaire Whu
 Stanislas-André Steeman as Matriche
 Gilberte Clair as Mona
 Krisha Duchesne as Lydia
 Lonne Voo as Lotus
 Georgette Anys

References

External links

1950 films
1950 crime films
1950s French-language films
Films based on Belgian novels
Films set in Shanghai
French crime films
French black-and-white films
1950s French films
Films based on works by Stanislas-André Steeman